"If You Buy This Record (Your Life Will Be Better)" (also titled without the parentheses) is a song by Italian music group the Tamperer featuring Maya. The song samples American singer Madonna's 1985 hit "Material Girl", which was the first time she allowed another artist to sample her music. It was released in Europe on 2 November 1998 and reached number three on the UK Singles Chart six days later. It also peaked within the top 10 in Denmark, Finland, Ireland and Italy. In the United States and Canada, it was given a release in 1999, becoming a dance hit in both countries.

Critical reception
Larry Flick from Billboard wrote that "as clever as peanut butter and chocolate, this full-on camp follow-up to (...) "Feel It" rewrites the instrumental hook of Madonna's "Material Girl" and wraps it around a super-catchy lyrical chant about how "f- f- f- f- f -f -f- fabulous" you'll be with this little ditty in hand." He noted further that "you can't deny its truth, given the adhesive sing-along verses about the improvements in life that Miss Days has seen since buying herself a piece of this musical carnival. The beat also hammers home with the potency of a massive facial tick, delivering the signature bass rollick that has ignited this group across much of Europe." He also stated that their only complaint is that "at 3:08, it's just too short", and added "take it to the beach, in the car, and impress your roommates with this care-free romp that couldn't deliver the season's fun quotient with any more good cheer."

British trade paper Music Week named "If You Buy This Record" its "Single of the Week" on their 17 October 1998 issue. Despite calling the track "cheesier than a bucket of fondue", the paper described the "Material Girl" sample as "irresistibly infectious" and referred to its title as "one of the cheekiest claims ever made".

Chart performance
In the Tamperer's native Italy, the track peaked at number four on the Musica e dischi chart. It was a top-three success in the United Kingdom, where it debuted and peaked at number three on 8 November 1998, topping the UK Indie Chart the same week. It earned a silver certification in the UK for shipping over 200,000 units and ended 1998 as the country's 59th-best-selling hit. In neighbouring Ireland, it reached number six, while across Europe, it peaked inside the top 20 in Austria, Flanders, Denmark, Finland, the Netherlands, and Sweden. On the Eurochart Hot 100, it rose to number eight on 28 November 1998.

"If You Buy This Record" was moderately successful outside Europe. In New Zealand, the single peaked at number 11 for two nonconsecutive weeks in February 1999, staying in the top 20 for 10 weeks and the top 50 for 16 weeks. In Australia, it repeatedly entered and exited the top 50 in early 1999, peaking at number 37 on 17 January 1999. The song was also successful on the American and Canadian dance charts, peaking in popularity in May 1999. In the former country, it reached number 15 on the Billboard Hot Dance Club Play chart and number 16 on the Billboard Hot Dance Singles Sales listing. On Canada's RPM Dance chart, the song peaked at number four on the issue of 3 May 1999.

Track listings

Italian 12-inch single
A1. "If You Buy This Record (Your Life Will Be Better)" (original version) – 4:30
A2. "If You Buy This Record (Your Life Will Be Better)" (airplay mix) – 3:30
B1. "If You Buy" (extended mix) – 5:00

UK 12-inch single
A1. "If You Buy This Record Your Life Will Be Better" (Sharp Blasted Master Remix) – 8:40
A2. "If You Buy This Record Your Life Will Be Better" (Dope Smugglaz Remix) – 6:27
B1. "Feel It" (Klubbheads Klubb Mix) – 7:29

UK CD single
 "If You Buy This Record Your Life Will Be Better" (radio edit) – 3:29
 "If You Buy This Record Your Life Will Be Better" (Sharp Blasted Master Remix Edit) – 6:20
 "If You Buy This Record Your Life Will Be Better" (Dope Smugglaz Remix) – 6:27

European CD single
 "If You Buy This Record Your Life Will Be Better" (radio edit) – 3:29
 "If You Buy This Record Your Life Will Be Better" (extended mix) – 5:00

European CD single – cardboard sleeve
 "If You Buy This Record Your Life Will Be Better" (radio edit) – 3:30
 "If You Buy This Record Your Life Will Be Better" (Sharp Blasted Master Remix Edit) – 6:14

Australian maxi-CD
 "If You Buy This Record (Your Life Will Be Better)" (radio edit) – 3:29
 "If You Buy This Record (Your Life Will Be Better)" (Sharp Blasted Master Remix Edit) – 6:20
 "If You Buy This Record (Your Life Will Be Better)" (Dope Smugglaz Remix) – 6:27
 "If You Buy This Record (Your Life Will Be Better)" (extended mix) – 5:00
 "Feel It" (Blunt Edit) – 3:15

US 12-inch single
A1. "If You Buy This Record Your Life Will Be Better" (Thunderpuss 2000 Club Mix) – 7:58
A2. "If You Buy This Record Your Life Will Be Better" (original extended) – 4:45
A3. "If You Buy This Record Your Life Will Be Better" (Thunderpuss Beats) – 3:25
B1. "If You Buy This Record Your Life Will Be Better" (Ralphi's 12-inch vocal) – 8:12
B2. "If You Buy This Record Your Life Will Be Better" (Thunderpuss 2000 Dub instrumental) – 6:49

US maxi-CD
 "If You Buy This Record Your Life Will Be Better" (radio mix) – 3:08
 "If You Buy Fabulous" (Thunderpuss 2000 Club Mix) – 7:58
 "If You Buy This Record Your Life Will Be Better" (original extended) – 4:47
 "If You Buy Fabulous" (Thunderpuss Beats) – 3:25
 "If You Buy Fabulous" (Ralphi's 12-inch vocal) – 8:12
 "If You Buy Fabulous" (Thunderpuss 2000 Dub instrumental) – 6:49

Credits and personnel
Credits are adapted from the European CD single liner notes.

Studio
 Recorded at Evento Musica and E-Mail Studio (Italy)

Personnel

 Steve Gittelman – writing, vocal production
 Jim Dyke – writing, vocal production
 Laura Dias – writing
 Peter Brown – writer of "Material Girl"
 Robert Rans – writer of "Material Girl"

 Falox – production
 Giuliano Saglia – executive production
 Giacomo Maiolini – executive production
 Graziano Fanelli – recording (Evento Musica)
 Gianluca Mensi – recording (E-Mail Studio)

Charts

Weekly charts

Year-end charts

Certifications

References

1998 singles
1998 songs
Jive Records singles
Mushroom Records singles
Songs written by Jim Dyke
Songs written by Peter Brown (singer)
The Tamperer songs
UK Independent Singles Chart number-one singles